Portfolio Analysis: Advanced topics in performance measurement, risk and attribution (Risk Books, 2006. ) is an industry text written by a comprehensive selection of industry experts and edited by Timothy P. Ryan. It includes chapters from practitioners and industry authors who investigate topics under the wide umbrella of performance measurement, attribution and risk management, drawing on their own experience of the fields.

The book also boasts a first in its area in that it brings together previously separated topics and practitioners or ex-post performance measurement and ex-ante performance risk measurement. It is also the first book to explain the role of the Transition Manager.

The book includes coverage and discussion of performance measurement, performance evaluation, portfolio risk, performance attribution, Value-at-Risk (VaR), managing tracking error and GIPS verification.

It is also said to cover the following developing areas of the marketplace:
Alternative assets
Hedge funds
Commodity futures
Life-cycle funds
Book income-orientated investments
Transition management

Full Alphabetical List of Contributors
To see a list of the chapters contributed by the following co-authors and an Editor Biography, see the Risk Books product page.

 Carl Bacon
 Curt Burmeister
 James G. Cashman
 Dr Andrew Colin
 Dan diBartolomeo
 Bruce J. Feibel
 Barry Feldman
 Andrew Scott Bay Frongello
 Philip H. Galdi
 Mark A. Keleher
 Robert Kuberek
 Peter Matheos
 Helmut Mausser
 Krishna Prasad 
 Ronald J. Surz
 Hilary Till
 Karyn D. Vincent
 Susan E. Woodward
 Laurence Wormald

References

External links
 Publisher Risk Books Product Page
 Free Download of Selected Chapters @ StatPro.com

2006 non-fiction books
Economics books